Matthew Ebden was the defending champion, but withdrew before the commencement of the tournament.

Marcos Baghdatis won the title, defeating Marinko Matosevic in the final, 6–4, 6–3.

Seeds

  Igor Sijsling (semifinals)
  Steve Johnson (quarterfinals)
  Marinko Matosevic (final)
  Benjamin Becker (first round)
  Kenny de Schepper (quarterfinals)
  Matthew Ebden (withdrew)
  Go Soeda (first round)
  Dudi Sela (second round)

Draw

Finals

Top half

Bottom half

References
 Main Draw
 Qualifying Draw

Aegon Trophyandnbsp;- Singles
2014 Men's Singles